Succession to the throne of Brunei is amongst the legitimate male descendants of Sultan Hashim Jalilul Alam Aqamaddin. 

  Sultan Omar Ali Saifuddien III (1914–1986)
  Sultan Hassanal Bolkiah (born 1946)
 (1) Crown Prince Al-Muhtadee Billah (born 1974): eldest son of Hassanal Bolkiah by his first wife
 (2) Prince Abdul Muntaqim (born 2007): grandson of Hassanal Bolkiah, eldest son of Al-Muhtadee Billah
  (3) Prince Muhammad Aiman (born 2015): grandson of Hassanal Bolkiah, second son of Al-Muhtadee Billah
 (4) Prince Abdul Malik (born 1983): second son of Hassanal Bolkiah by his first wife
 (5) Prince Abdul Mateen (born 1991): second son of Hassanal Bolkiah by his second wife
  (6) Prince 'Abdul Wakeel (born 2006): eldest son of Hassanal Bolkiah by his third wife
 (7) Prince Haji Mohamed Bolkiah (born 1947): brother of Hassanal Bolkiah, second son of Omar Ali Saifuddien III
 (8) Prince 'Abdu'l Qawi (born 1974): eldest son of Mohamed Bolkiah
  (9) Prince Abdul Muhaimin (born 2022): grandson of Mohamed Bolkiah, son of 'Abdu'l Qawi
 (10) Prince 'Abdu'l Fattah (born 1982): second son of Mohamed Bolkiah
 (11) Prince 'Abdu'l Mu'min (born 1983): third son of Mohamed Bolkiah
 (12) Prince Omar 'Ali (born 1986): fourth son of Mohamed Bolkiah
  (13) Prince 'Abdu'l Muqtadir: fifth son of Mohamed Bolkiah
 (14) Prince Haji Sufri Bolkiah (born 1951): brother of Hassanal Bolkiah, third son of Omar Ali Saifuddien III
 (15) Prince Muhammad Safiz (born 1974): son of Sufri Bolkiah
 (16) Prince 'Abdu'l Khaliq: son of Sufri Bolkiah
  (17) Prince 'Abdu'l Aleem: son of Sufri Bolkiah
  (18) Prince Haji Jefri Bolkiah (born 1954): brother of Hassanal Bolkiah, fourth son of Omar Ali Saifuddien III
 (19) Prince 'Abdu'l Hakeem Jefri Bolkiah (born 1973): son of Jefri Bolkiah
  (20) Prince Abdul Halim Ar-Rahman: grandson of Jefri Bolkiah, son of 'Abdu'l Hakeem Jefri Bolkiah
 (21) Prince Bahar (born 1981): son of Jefri Bolkiah
 (22) Prince Hasan Kiko (born 1995): son of Jefri Bolkiah
 (23) Prince Faiq (born 1998): son of Jefri Bolkiah
  (24)  Prince Musa (born 1990): grandson of Abdul Samad

External links

Brunei
Line of succession to the throne of